The 1966 East Texas State Lions football team represented East Texas State University in the 1966 NAIA football season. They were led by head coach Ernest Hawkins, who was in his third season at East Texas State. The Lions played their home games at Memorial Stadium and were members of the Lone Star Conference. With a 5–3–2 record, the Lions won the Lone Star Conference championship, the first of four under Hawkins. Tailback Curtis Guyton was named All-American, the first black player in program history to be named All-American.

Schedule

Postseason awards

All-Americans
 Curtis Guyton, Halfback, 3rd Team

All-Lone Star Conference

LSC Superlatives
 Coach of the year: Ernest Hawkins

LSC First Team
 Curtis Guyton, Halfback

LSC Second Team
 Charles Froneberger, Center
 Bill Garner, Defensive End
 David McKay, Safety
 Mike Venable, Linebacker
 Sam Walton, Offensive Tackle
 Ronald Zwernemann, Offensive Tackle

LSC Honorable Mention
Tommy Briscoe, Offensive Guard
Leo Rhodes, Offensive Guard
Tim Smith, Defensive Tackle

References

East Texas State
Texas A&M–Commerce Lions football seasons
Lone Star Conference football champion seasons
East Texas State Lions football